Ben McKay (born 24 December 1997) is a professional Australian rules footballer playing for the North Melbourne Football Club in the Australian Football League (AFL).

AFL Career

He was drafted by North Melbourne with their first selection and twenty-first overall in the 2015 national draft.
In February 2019, Ben signed a two-year contract extension keeping him at the Kangaroos until at least the end of 2021.

Taking time to develop, Ben McKay found consistency at AFL level, playing 11 games in the backline in the 2020 season. A great contested mark and busy player under pressure, McKay continued his form into 2021

McKay will miss the start of the 2023 AFL Season after suffering a foot injury during a practice match between North Melbourne and the Western Bulldogs. The injury means that McKay will likely miss the first four games of the season, including the round 4 game against Carlton, where his brother Harry plays. Despite both playing in the AFL, the two have never faced off against each other.

Family
He is the mirror twin brother of 's Harry McKay. As of 2022, the two are yet to play an AFL game against each other despite seven years in the league, often as a result of one of the two being suspended or withdrawn late with injury – leading to internet jokes that they are the same player running a fake twin gambit.

Statistics
Statistics are correct to Round 8 2021

|- 
| scope="row" text-align:center | 2017
| 
| 23 || 1 || 0 || 0 || 2 || 7 || 9 || 1 || 3 || 0.0 || 0.0 || 2.0 || 7.0 || 9.0 || 1.0 || 3.0
|- style="background:#EAEAEA"
| scope="row" text-align:center | 2018
|  
| 23 || - || - || - || - || - || - || - || - || - || - || - || - || - || - || - 
|- 
| scope="row" text-align:center | 2019
| 
| 23 || 3 || 0 || 1 || 11 || 10 || 21 || 10 || 4 || 0.0 || 0.3 || 3.7 || 3.3 || 7.0 || 3.3 || 1.3 
|- style="background:#EAEAEA"
| scope="row" text-align:center | 2020
|  
| 23 || 11 || 0 || 0 || 43 || 59 || 102 || 36 || 18 || 0.0 || 0.0 || 3.9 || 5.4 || 9.3 || 3.3 || 1.6 
|- 
| scope="row" text-align:center | 2021
|  
| 23 || 8 || 0 || 0 || 37 || 47 || 84 || 34 || 12 || 0.0 || 0.0 || 4.6 || 5.9 || 10.5 || 5.9 || 1.5 
|- style="background:#EAEAEA"
| scope="row" text-align:center class="sortbottom" colspan=3 | Career
| 23
| 0
| 1
| 93
| 123
| 216
| 81
| 37
| 0.0
| 0.1
| 4.0
| 5.4
| 9.4
| 3.5
| 1.6
|}

References

External links

1997 births
Living people
Twin sportspeople
North Melbourne Football Club players
Gippsland Power players
Australian rules footballers from Victoria (Australia)